D'Angelo Jiménez (born Dec. 21, 1977) is a former Major League Baseball player. He was an infielder that played primarily at second base. He had been considered one of the Yankees' top prospects, but in early 2000 Jiménez injured his back in a car crash that required him to miss the 2000 season. 

In , Jiménez appeared in a game as a pitcher for the San Diego Padres. He pitched  innings, allowing no hits and no runs. On October 23, 2006, Jiménez was released by the Oakland Athletics making him a free agent.

Jiménez started  with the Triple-A Columbus Clippers. The Washington Nationals purchased his contract on April 4, . He appeared primarily as a pinch-hitter and defensive replacement, but he was not a successful hitter. On July 19, 2007, Jimenez was called as a pinch hitter and drove in the game-winning single after being in a horrible slump batting .

He signed a minor league contract with the St. Louis Cardinals on December 19, 2007, and became a free agent at the end of the season. On April 17, 2009 Jimenez signed a minor league deal with the New York Yankees. Later in the year he played for the Newark Bears of the Atlantic League  On June 19, 2010, he signed with the Minnesota Twins and was assigned to the Rochester Red Wings. Previously, he was playing baseball in Mexico. Jimenez played with the Lincoln Saltdogs of the American Association of Independent Professional Baseball during the 2012 season. He spent 2013 with the Camden Riversharks of the Atlantic League.

References

External links

1977 births
Camden Riversharks players
Charlotte Knights players
Chattanooga Lookouts players
Chicago White Sox players
Cincinnati Reds players
Columbus Clippers players
Dominican Republic expatriate baseball players in Mexico
Dominican Republic expatriate baseball players in the United States
Greensboro Bats players
Gulf Coast Yankees players
Leones de Yucatán players
Lincoln Saltdogs players

Living people
Major League Baseball players from the Dominican Republic
Major League Baseball second basemen
Major League Baseball third basemen
Mexican League baseball infielders
Memphis Redbirds players
New Jersey Jackals players
New York Yankees players
Newark Bears players
Norwich Navigators players
Oakland Athletics players
Pericos de Puebla players
Rochester Red Wings players
Rojos del Águila de Veracruz players
Sacramento River Cats players
San Diego Padres players
Tampa Yankees players
Texas Rangers players
Washington Nationals players
Tigres del Licey players
Toros del Este players
Gigantes del Cibao players
Lobos de Arecibo players
Dominican Republic expatriate baseball players in Puerto Rico
Sportspeople from Santo Domingo